The Naval Historical Foundation, was a nonprofit organization founded in 1926 and disbanded in 2022. It had a broad mission to preserve and promote the naval history of the United States by supporting official Sea Services programs and institutions, meeting the needs of the public for naval history, and collecting historical items. The foundation was located at the Washington Navy Yard, in Washington, D.C.

Awards
The Commodore Dudley W. Knox Naval History Lifetime Achievement Award was established by the Naval Historical Foundation in Washington, D.C., to honor the memory of the naval historian Commodore Dudley W. Knox and to recognize the lifetime achievements of historians of the United States Navy.

Knox Award recipients

 2013 James C. Bradford, William N. Still, Jr., Philip K. Lundeberg
 2014 John Hattendorf, Craig L. Symonds, William S. Dudley, Harold D. Langley.
2015 Dean C. Allard, Thomas J. Cutler, Kenneth J. Hagan
2016 Christopher McKee
2017 Jon Sumida, Paul Stillwell, Edward Marolda
2019 Tyrone G. Martin, Norman Polmar, David Curtis Skaggs, Jr.

Pull Together
Pull Together is the official newsletter of the Naval Historical Foundation. Articles cover all aspects of American naval history, including narrative and eyewitness accounts of naval battles and operations, biographical studies, announcements of upcoming events, book notices and reviews. The editorial staff welcomes article submissions.

Officers

Naval Historical Foundation directors

 Chairman: ADM William J. Fallon, USN (Ret.)
 Executive Director: RADM Edward Masso, USN (Ret.)
 Mr. Matthew P. Bergman
 Mr. Martin Bollinger
 The Honorable Kenneth J. Braithwaite, II
 VADM Walter E. Carter, Jr., USN (Ret.)
 Dr. Kate C. Epstein
 ADM James G. Foggo III, USN (Ret.)
 RADM Vincent L. Griffith, USN (Ret.)
 RADM Sinclair Harris, USN (Ret.) 
 Dr. Henry J. Hendrix II, Capt., USN (Ret.)
 The Honorable Steven S. Honigman
 Mr. James D. Hornfischer
 Mr. Roger A. Krone 
 The Honorable John F. Lehman, Jr. 
 RADM Larry R. Marsh, USN (Ret.)
 CAPT James A. Noone, USNR (Ret.)
 VADM Frank C. Pandolfe, USN (Ret.)
 The Honorable BJ Penn
 Dr. David A. Rosenberg, CAPT, USN (Ret.)
 Mr. Michael J. Wallace

Past presidents 

 ADM Austin M. Knight, USN (Ret.) 1926-1927
 VADM William L. Rodgers, USN (Ret.) 1927-1943
 ADM Joseph Strauss, USN (Ret.) 1943-1946
 FADM Ernest J. King, USN (Ret.) 1946-1949
 FADM William D. Leahy, USN (Ret.) 1949-1959
 COMO Dudley W. Knox, USN (Ret.) 1959-1961
 VADM John F. Shafroth Jr., USN (Ret.) 1961-1967
 VADM Walter S. DeLany, USN (Ret.) 1967-1980
 ADM James L. Holloway III, USN (Ret.) 1980-1998
 VADM Robert F. Dunn, USN (Ret.) 1998-2012
 RADM John T. Mitchell, Jr., USN (Ret.) 2012- 2016
 RDML Arthur N. Langston, III, USN (Ret.) 2016-2019

Past chairmen 

 ADM Robert B. Carney, USN (Ret.) 1961-1981
 ADM Arleigh A. Burke, USN (Ret.) 1981-1985
 RADM Elliott B. Strauss, USN (Ret.) 1985-1998
 ADM James L. Holloway III, USN (Ret.) 1998-2008
 ADM Bruce DeMars, USN (Ret.) 2008-2015

See also

 List of history awards

References

External links
Official website

1926 establishments in the United States
Historical societies of the United States
Organizations established in 1926